Gommalacca (Italian for "Shellac") is a studio album by Italian singer-songwriter Franco Battiato, issued in 1998. The album was described as "vigorous and inspired [...] with hard and distorted sounds and bold samples set in lavish arrangements."

Track listing
Shock in my town- 4.24 - (lyrics: Franco Battiato, Manlio Sgalambro)
Auto da fé - 3.59 - (lyrics: Franco Battiato, Manlio Sgalambro)
Casta diva - 3.38 - (lyrics: Franco Battiato, Manlio Sgalambro)
Il ballo del potere - 4.26 - (lyrics: Franco Battiato, Manlio Sgalambro)
La preda - 3.44
Il mantello e la spiga - 3.59
È stato molto bello - 3.49 
Quello che fu - 4.30
Vite parallele - 3.24
Shakleton - 8.35 - (German lyrics: Fleur Jaeggy)

Music by Franco Battiato. Lyrics by Manlio Sgalambro except when noted.

References

1998 albums
Franco Battiato albums
Italian-language albums